Adithya Varma is a 2019 Indian Tamil-language romantic drama film directed by Gireeshaaya in his directorial debut and produced by Mukesh Mehta under E4 Entertainment. The film stars Dhruv Vikram in his acting debut and Banita Sandhu in her Tamil debut, while Priya Anand appears in a supporting role. A remake of the Telugu film Arjun Reddy (2017) directed by Sandeep Reddy Vanga, it follows Dhruv Vikram, playing the titular character Adithya Varma, a high-functioning alcoholic surgeon who has anger management problems. He pushes himself to a self-destructive path after the marriage of his girlfriend Meera; following which, the film focuses on his downfall and subsequent resurgence.

The film was originally directed by Bala under the title Varmaa and shot between March and September 2018; however, in February 2019, due to creative differences, E4 Entertainment decided to re-launch it with a new cast and crew; only Dhruv and music composer Radhan were retained. While the original version had cinematography by M. Sukumar and Sathish Suriya, the new version was replaced by Ravi K. Chandran and Vivek Harshan. The new version, titled Adithya Varma, began filming in March 2019 and ended that May.

Originally scheduled to release on 8 November 2019, the film was postponed due to distribution issues. The film was released worldwide on 21 November 2019, and in India, the next day. The film opened to a positive response praising the performance of Dhruv, and the adaptation of the film from the original. Dhruv was awarded the Best Debut Actor at the 13th Ananda Vikatan Cinema Awards and Zee Cine Awards Tamil.

Plot 
Adithya Vasudevan Varma is a house surgeon in Mangalore, India. Despite being a brilliant student, he has severe anger management issues that earn the wrath of the dean of the college. Adithya's aggressive nature also earns him a reputation among his juniors as a college bully. After having a brawl alongside his friend Tarun against members of the opposing team during an inter-college football match, the dean asks Adithya to either apologise or leave the college. Adithya initially chooses to leave, but stays back after meeting an almost mute first-year student Meera Shetty because he experienced love at first sight.

Adithya and his friend Parthi enter a third-year classroom and announce that Adithya is in love with Meera and asserts that she is exclusive to him. Initially afraid, Meera starts adjusting herself to Adithya's overbearing attitude. She eventually reciprocates his feelings and they develop an intimate relationship. Adithya graduates with an MBBS degree and leaves for Mussoorie to pursue a master's degree in Orthopaedic surgery. Over the course of three years, Adithya's and Meera's relationship becomes stronger. Months later, Adithya visits Meera's house, where her father Manohar Shetty sees them kissing and throws Adithya out.

Manohar opposes her and Adithya's relationship due to Adithya's brash behaviour and also because they belong to different castes. Adithya demands that Meera must make a decision within six hours otherwise he will end their relationship. Following this incident, Meera's parents seize her phone, making her unable to contact Adithya. By the time she manages to visit Adithya's house, he is drunk, injects morphine into himself, and becomes unconscious for two days. Meera is then forcibly married to someone from her caste. Adhi learns about the marriage from Parthi and goes to her house in protest. He is assaulted and gets arrested for making a scene. Adhi's father Vasudevan Varma ostracises him from the family home for damaging his reputation.

With Parthi's help, Adhi finds a rented apartment and joins a private hospital as a surgeon. To cope with his emotions, he starts taking drugs, attempts one-night stands, buys a pet dog and names it after Meera and drinks alcohol; all of which are unsuccessful. Within months, he becomes a successful surgeon and a high-functioning alcoholic who is feared by the hospital's staff members, one of the reasons being his high surgery count. Adhi's self-destructing behaviour and refusal to move on worries Parthi and Tarun. He persuades one of his patients, Priya Menen, a leading film star, to have a no-strings relationship with him, which he ends when she falls in love with him.

On a day off, Adhi unwillingly agrees to perform life-saving surgery and collapses with dehydration. The hospital staff examine his blood samples, which show traces of alcohol and cocaine. The hospital chief files a case against Adhitya, who accepts the truth on the grounds of violating his professional ethics during an in-house court hearing, despite Parthi making arrangements to bail him out. Adhi's medical license is cancelled for five years and he is evicted from the flat. The next morning, Parthi manages to reach Adithya to convey his grandmother's death; he meets Vasudevan, and they reconcile. Adhi gives up his self-destructive habits soon after.

While leaving for a vacation, Adhi sees a pregnant Meera sitting in a park. Convinced that she is unhappy with her marriage, Adhi meets her after returning from his vacation. Meera reveals that she left her husband days after their marriage and continued to work in a clinic. She tells Adhi that he is the child's father, and they reunite. The pair marries, and Meera's father apologises for misunderstanding their love for each other.

Cast 

Additionally, Priya Anand's Shih Tzu Bumblebee plays the title character's pet dog. Vikram made a uncredited appearance in the song "Dhooram" as a visitor in Dehradun.

Production

Original 

In September 2017, it was announced that E4 Entertainment had bought the rights to remake the Telugu film Arjun Reddy (2017) in Tamil and Malayalam languages. The following month, Bala was chosen to direct the yet-untitled Tamil remake. On 10 November 2017, the title was announced as Varma, although it would later be amended to Varmaa. Raju Murugan was chosen to pen the dialogues. M. Sukumar was selected to handle the cinematography and Sathish Suriya was chosen as the film editor, after having earlier worked for Bala's Naachiyaar (2018). Producer Mukesh Mehta said the remake would be 20 minutes shorter than the Telugu original. Actor Vikram's son Dhruv Vikram was cast as the male lead, making his acting debut. It would have been the debut for the Kolkata-based model Megha, who was chosen to play the female lead. Akash Premkumar was chosen to play the lead character's best friend. Whereas other roles were given to Easwari Rao, Raiza Wilson, Sandra Amy and Mathew Varghese.

Principal photography began in early March 2018 at Kathmandu, Nepal, and a week later, after completing the first schedule there, the crew shifted to Chennai for the second schedule. However, shooting of the film was briefly stalled due to the Tamil Film Producers Council strike, but resumed in April after the strike ended. The final schedule of the film took place in August 2018, for which the team had shifted to Tiruvannamalai. It was completed in September 2018, thus principal photography of the film has wrapped.

New version 
On 7 February 2019, E4 Entertainment issued a press statement stating that they would go for a re-shoot of the entire film as they were not satisfied with the final cut provided by Bala. They added that the film would be relaunched with a completely new cast and crew while retaining Dhruv. Bala decried these comments, saying it was his own decision to quit the film "in order to safeguard creative freedom" because he was asked to make changes. This became the first such incident in the history of Tamil cinema that the producer of the film refuses to release the film due to unsatisfactory final cut despite the completion of the film. On 19 February 2019, the new title Adithya Varma was announced.

Mehta said the new version would begin filming in March 2019, with Arjun Reddy writer-director Sandeep Reddy Vanga's assistant Gireesaaya was announced as the new director, making his directorial debut. Banita Sandhu was announced as the heroine, in her Tamil film debut, as well as Priya Anand as the supporting actress. Anbu Thasan joined the cast in March as the title character's friend, replacing Akash Premkumar. Ravi K. Chandran and Vivek Harshan were announced as the cinematographer and the editor respectively. Principal photography for Adithya Varma began on 11 March. Following the filming of a song sequence in Portugal in mid-April 2019, 65% of the film's shoot was complete. Major portions of the film had been completed in mid-May, with the exception of patchwork scenes, for which Ravi K. Chandran's son Santhana Krishnan handled the cinematography for the film. The principal photography was wrapped up within July 2019.

Music 

The music for the film was composed by Radhan, who also scored for the original film Arjun Reddy, with lyrics written by Thamarai, Vivek, Viveka, Sivakarthikeyan, Dhruv and Radhan himself. Harshavardhan Rameshwar retained the background score from the original film and its Hindi remake Kabir Singh (2019), also directed by Vanga. Radhan had signed the project when it was titled Varmaa, and was retained for Adithya Varma. The song "Vaanodum Mannodum", written by Vairamuthu and sung by Vignesh G. for Varmaa, was released on 27 December 2018 as a single, but was not included on Adithya Varma.

Aditya Music acquired the audio rights for Adithya Varma. The song "Edharkadi", written by Vivek, marks Dhruv's debut as a playback singer, and was released as the film's first single on 16 August 2019. Another single, "Yaen Ennai Pirindhaai", sung by Sid Sriram was released on 23 September 2019, which coincided with the lead actor's birthday. The rest of the songs, along with the full album was released on 19 October 2019, at a launch event held at Sathyam Cinemas in Chennai, with the presence of the cast and crew, with actor Vikram preceding the event. For all the songs (with the exception of "Yaen Ennai Pirindhaai"), Radhan reused the tunes from his own compositions from Arjun Reddy. Aditya Music released two additional songs, post the film's release: "Nenjukulle" (based on "Gundelona" from Arjun Reddy), written by Mohan Rajan and sung by Shweta Mohan, and an instrumental number titled "Aditya Varma Theme" which has vocals from Dhruv himself.

Writing for The Times of India, Sruthi Raman reviewed "The album's smart soundtrack ends up evoking memories of Radhan's best work." Behindwoods gave the album a rating of 3 out of 5 and stated "Radhan offers a youthful album with a zeal that is impartially complimenting with eminent scores and beautiful lyrics." Moviecrow gave the album 3 out of 5 and summarised "Radhan reused the songs from the Telugu, but that doesn't take away the effectiveness of the soundtrack. The exquisite tunes and the inventiveness of the soundtrack make this one an enjoyable album in Tamil also."

Release 
Adithya Varma was initially scheduled to release on 8 November 2019. In a turn of events, the makers postponed the release due to distribution problems and did not initially reveal the new release date. Later, the makers announced that the film will be released on 21 November 2019.

Adithya Varma was given an A certificate, from the Central Board of Film Certification, though the makers of the film hoped it would receive a U/A certificate. E4 later pushed the film's Indian release to 22 November, a day after the worldwide release. Shakthi Film Factory acquired the film's Tamil Nadu distribution rights when it was titled Varmaa, but E4 later acquired them for Adithya Varma.

Marketing 
The teaser trailer for Varmaa was released on 23 September 2018. It was widely ridiculed and criticised on social media, while a critic from The New Indian Express called it "a failed attempt to remake the original". The teaser for Adithya Varma was released on 16 June 2019. It was positively received by a number of critics, in contrast to the teaser for Varmaa. The official trailer of the film was unveiled on 19 October 2019, coinciding with the film's audio launch event.

Home media 
The satellite rights of the film were sold to Sun Tv. The film's television premiere took place on 26 January 2020, coinciding with Republic Day. The film was digitally premiered on Amazon Prime Video on 20 December 2019.

Reception 
Adithya Varma received positive reviews from critics. M. Suganth of The Times of India gave 3.5 out of 5 stars rating "A well-made, if overtly faithful, remake of Arjun Reddy with Dhruv". Behindwoods gave 2.75 out of 5 stars rating "Dhruv Vikram single-handedly powers Adithya Varma to make it a worthy watch. The film will work better for those who have not seen the original." Indiaglitz gave the film 3 out of 5 stating "Go for this faithful remake that has a gutsy and arresting performance by Dhruv Vikram and a strong love story at its core." India Today gave 3 out of 5 stars stating "Dhruv Vikram makes a strong debut with Adithya Varma, but the story gets repetitive if you have watched Arjun Reddy and Kabir Singh." Sify rated 3.5 out of 5 and summarised "Adithya Varma has proved that Dhruv is a super talented performer who can be the next chocolate boy of Tamil cinema."

Hindustan Times reviewed it as "The highlight of this faithful remake of Telugu hit Arjun Reddy is the performance of debutant Dhruv Vikram. He is refreshing and sincere as a flawed medical student." Sreedhar Pillai from Firstpost gave 3.25 out of 5 and reviewed "Adithya Varma is a raw and hard-hitting film which rides on Dhruv Vikram's performance. This is a star in the making; truly, a chip off the old block." The Indian Express gave the film 3 out of 5 stated "Dhruv Vikram shines in this faithfully-remade problematic film."

S. Srivatsan of The Hindu wrote "The third installment of this script still has no proper justification for the lead character's aggressiveness, despite a decent showing from Dhruv Vikram in his Tamil debut." Baradwaj Rangan of Film Companion wrote "Like Arjun Reddy, this is a beautifully made film. The director allows it to breathe. Ravi K Chandran doesn't romanticise the already Romantic story. Except in a few shots, his palette is neutral, natural.., the editor Vivek Harshan cuts many scenes a few frames earlier than you'd expect the “finish” (the segues are amazingly dynamic)...I don't recall the editing pattern of Arjun Reddy, but these rhythms feel refreshingly new for Tamil cinema".

Awards and nominations

References

External links 
 

2010s Tamil-language films
2019 romantic drama films
2010s avant-garde and experimental films
2019 films
Films about depression
Films shot in Chennai
Films shot in Portugal
Indian avant-garde and experimental films
Indian romantic drama films
Medical-themed films
Tamil remakes of Telugu films
2019 directorial debut films
Films about surgeons